Carol Los Mansmann (August 7, 1942 – March 9, 2002) was a United States circuit judge of the United States Court of Appeals for the Third Circuit and a United States district judge of the United States District Court for the Western District of Pennsylvania.

Education and career

Born in Pittsburgh, Pennsylvania, Mansmann received a Bachelor of Arts degree from Duquesne University in 1964 and a Juris Doctor from Duquesne University School of Law in 1967. She was a law clerk to Ralph H. Smith, Jr. of the Allegheny County Court of Common Pleas from 1967 to 1968, and then an assistant district attorney of Allegheny County, Pennsylvania from 1968 to 1972. She was in private practice in Pittsburgh from 1973 to 1979, and was also a special assistant to the Attorney General of Pennsylvania from 1974 to 1979. Mansmann was on the faculty of the Duquesne University School of Law as an associate professor of law from 1974 to 1983, and later as an adjunct professor of law from 1987 to 1994.

Federal judicial service

Mansmann was nominated by President Ronald Reagan on February 23, 1982, to a seat on the United States District Court for the Western District of Pennsylvania vacated by Judge William W. Knox. She was confirmed by the United States Senate on March 18, 1982, and received commission on March 19, 1982. Her service terminated on April 22, 1985, due to elevation to the Third Circuit.

Mansmann was nominated by President Reagan on March 7, 1985, to the United States Court of Appeals for the Third Circuit, to a new seat authorized by 98 Stat. 333. She was confirmed by the Senate on April 3, 1985, and received commission on April 4, 1985. Her service terminated on March 9, 2002, due to death.

Death

Mansmann died of breast cancer in Pittsburgh on March 9, 2002.

References

Sources
 

1942 births
2002 deaths
Judges of the United States District Court for the Western District of Pennsylvania
United States district court judges appointed by Ronald Reagan
20th-century American judges
Judges of the United States Court of Appeals for the Third Circuit
United States court of appeals judges appointed by Ronald Reagan
Duquesne University alumni
Duquesne University School of Law alumni
Duquesne University faculty
20th-century American women judges